Soraya Arnelas Rubiales (born 13 September 1982), better known by her stage name Soraya, is a Spanish singer. Soraya represented Spain at the Eurovision Song Contest 2009 in Moscow, Russia with the song "La noche es para mí" finishing 23rd with 23 points.

Biography

Early life 
Arnelas was born in Valencia de Alcántara, Cáceres, Spain on 13 September 1982. At the age of 11, she left for Madrid. She wanted to study drama but soon started working as a flight attendant for Iberworld, where she travelled around the world. Apart from her native Spanish, she is also fluent in English and Portuguese.

2005: Operación Triunfo and Corazón De Fuego
Soraya participated in the fourth series of the Spanish television series Operación Triunfo in 2005 where she came second overall. Her début album Corazón De Fuego was released on 5 December 2005 produced by Kike Santander. The album got Platinum status.

2006: Ochenta's
On 21 November 2006, Soraya released her second album, Ochenta's. It was her first English language album. The first single was a cover of the Italian singer RAF 's song "Self Control". The remainder of the album was a mixture of 1980s cover versions and new songs. The song reached Gold Status in the Promusicae Digital Songs charts and peaked at number 1 on the Spanish Cadena 100. The second single from Ochenta's was a cover of Spagna's "Call Me". Ochenta's was one of the most successful albums of 2007 in Spain and achieved platinum after many weeks charting in the top ten albums chart.

2007: Dolce Vita
Soraya released another album with more covers of 1980s hits titled Dolce Vita. The lead single was "La Dolce Vita". The album includes covers of 1980s hits, including Kylie Minogue's "I Should Be So Lucky", Cyndi Lauper's "Girls Just Want to Have Fun", Eurythmics's "Sweet Dreams (Are Made of This)", Modern Talking's "You're My Heart, You're My Soul" and the lead single, "Dolce Vita", a cover from the Italian singer Ryan Paris. The album shot straight inside the Spanish Top 5 Albums Chart, peaking at No.5, and getting Gold certification in the following weeks.

The album was released in the United Kingdom via iTunes UK and 7digital.

2008: Sin Miedo
Sin Miedo was Soraya's fourth released album. Leaving the 1980s covers behind, this album contains 12 original tracks; nine in Spanish and three in English. The album was produced by International DJ DJ Sammy and includes a duo with Kate Ryan (the song Caminaré).</ref> The first single of the album was Sin miedo (Without fear).

The album debuted on the Spanish Albums Chart at a low #21, becoming her worst position for a studio album. The album has spent 22 weeks on chart so far. However, the album saw a Top 40 reentry at #32 thanks to a brand new edition of Sin Miedo.

2009: Eurovision and other television projects
By the end of 2008, she submitted one of the songs from her latest album, Sin Miedo, "La noche es para mí" to the Spanish preselection for the Eurovision Song Contest 2009 in Russia, being considered the early favourite to represent the country. She was finally chosen to represent Spain on 28 February 2009. Soraya's Eurovision team consisted of a Swedish songwriting team.  She heavily promoted in Sweden in the months leading up to the contest.  Being an automatic finalist representing Spain, she performed in the 25th position on Final night, finishing second to last.  However, juries and televoters did not vote for the song, and it finished in the twenty fourth place. Arnelas referred to the score as a punishment from Europe, for Radio Television Española's late airing of the second semi-final where Spanish televoters and jury members were to vote.

Previously to her Eurovision experience, she participated in the reality talent contest La Batalla de los Coros, the Spanish version of Clash of the Choirs.

After visiting more than 20 cities, Soraya ended her Sin Miedo Spanish Tour 2009 on 13 September 2009.

2010: Dreamer
After leaving her label Vale Music / Universal in late 2010, Soraya signed a record deal with Sony Music to record her fifth studio album Dreamer. The first single to be released from this album was "Live Your Dreams", an electronic-dance-pop song, produced by French DJ Antoine Clamaran. The video for the song was filmed in Paris on March and was released in June 2010.

The single peaked at #8 on the French Club Chart, while it peaked at #13 on the airplay chart and #47 in the download chart. The CD-Single debuted and peaked at #11 in the French Singles Chart, staying a total of 7 weeks into the Top15. It also reached #20 at the Russian Airplay Chart. This was Soraya's first entry in both France and Russian charts. In Belgium it peaked at #51. While in Poland the song reached #16 in the airplay chart. In Spain, the song was #18 in the airplay chart.

The album was released on September 28, 2010, in Spain, reaching number 1 on iTunes the same day it was released. The album peaked at #8 on the Spanish Albums Chart. Dreamer supposed the return of Soraya to the Top10, achieving more success than its predecessor so far. The promotion of the album was supported by a tour through some European countries.

2013: Con Fuego & Universe In Me
On 19 February Soraya released an electronic/dance track in co-operation with Aqeel. This was the first song she released along with her own company label, Valentia Records. The song topped the iTunes Spanish Chart, it also made a top thirty (#29) official debut in PROMUSICAE only with downloads but a top ten (#7) in the physical singles chart due to the CD Single release.

Personal life
Since 2012, Soraya is in a relationship with male model Miguel Ángel Herrera. Soraya gave birth to the couple's first child, Manuela Grace, on 24 February 2017.

Discography

Studio albums

Live albums

Singles

As lead artist

As featured artist

Filmography

Television

References

External links
 
 

1982 births
Living people
People from the Province of Cáceres
Eurovision Song Contest entrants of 2009
Singers from Extremadura
Eurovision Song Contest entrants for Spain
Star Academy participants
Spanish people of Portuguese descent
Arnelas, Soraya
English-language singers from Spain
Flight attendants
Operación Triunfo contestants
21st-century Spanish singers
21st-century Spanish women singers